Harold Smith may refer to:

Entertainment
 Harold Jacob Smith (1912–1970), American screenwriter
 Harold J. Smith (1912–1980), TV actor better known as Jay Silverheels
 Harold Smith (Twin Peaks), fictional television character

Politics
 Harold Smith (New Zealand politician) (1866–1936), New Zealand MP
 Harold Smith (British politician) (1876–1924), MP for Warrington, 1910–1922, and Liverpool Wavertree, 1922–1923
 Harold Gengoult Smith (1890–1983), Australian medical practitioner and Lord Mayor of Melbourne
 Harold D. Smith (1898–1947), American budget director during World War II
 Harold Palmer Smith Jr. (born 1935), assistant secretary of Defense

Science
 Harold Hill Smith (1910–1994), American geneticist
 Harold Smith (scientist) (born 1954), founder and CEO of OyaGen

Sports
 Harold Smith (diver) (1909–1958), American diver and Olympic gold medalist
 Harold Smith (gridiron football) (born 1962), American football player

Other
 Harold Page Smith (1904–1993), United States Navy admiral
 J. Harold Smith (1910–2001), Southern Baptist evangelist
 Harold Smith (detective) (1926–2005), art detective

See also
Whatever Happened to Harold Smith?, a 1999 British film
Hal Smith (disambiguation)